Roger André Jurriens (born 29 December 1965) is a sailor who competed internationally for Aruba in the windsurfing event at the 1992 Summer Olympics.

Career
Jurriens competed at the 1992 Summer Olympics in the  Lechner A-390 windsurfing event. They competed in 10 races, and in the end Jurriens finished in 37th place out of 45 starters.

References

External links
 
 
 

1965 births
Living people
Aruban male sailors (sport)
Aruban windsurfers
Olympic sailors of Aruba
Sailors at the 1992 Summer Olympics – Lechner A-390
Place of birth missing (living people)